Bördner, Bordner is a German surname. Notable people with the surname include: 

 D.M. Bordner, pen name of Tim Patten 
 Elias Bördner (born 2002), German footballer
 Otti Geschka (born 1939), born Ottilie Bördner

German-language surnames